The 2020 wildfire season involves wildfires on multiple continents.

Africa

Asia 
India
 2020 Uttarakhand forest fires
Russia
 2020 Siberia wildfires
In Russia’s two easternmost districts, 18,591 distinct fires have consumed .

In September 2020 scientists warned that an "international effort is needed to manage a changing fire regime in the vulnerable Arctic", reporting that satellite data shows how the Arctic fire regime is changing. On 3 September EU institutions reported that, according to satellite data, the Arctic fires already far surpassed the total of CO2 emissions for the 2019 season.
Syria
Fires in Al-Suwayda Governorate in May, followed by Al-Hasakah Governorate in the summer, then in Latakia and Hama Governorates in September, next in Latakia again, Homs, and Tartus Governorates in October.
Turkey
 2020 Turkish wildfires

Europe 
 2020 Chernobyl Exclusion Zone wildfires, Ukraine

North America 

 United States 
 2020 Western United States wildfire season
2020 Arizona wildfires, United States
2020 California wildfires, United States
2020 Nevada wildfires, United States
2020 New Mexico wildfires, United States
2020 Utah wildfires, United States
2020 Washington wildfires, United States
2020 Oregon wildfires, United States
2020 Colorado wildfires, United States

 Year-to-date wildfire figures
United States agencies stationed at the National Interagency Fire Center in Idaho maintain a "National Large Incident Year-to-Date Report" on wildfires, delineating 10 sub-national areas, aggregating the regional and national totals of burn size, fire suppression cost, and razed structure count, among other data. As of October 21, "Coordination Centers" of each geography report the following:

Note: Check primary sources for up-to-date statistics.

{| class="wikitable sortable plainrowheaders" style="text-align:center;"
|-
! scope="col" | Coordination Center
! scope="col" | Acres
! scope="col" | Hectares
! scope="col" | Suppression Costs
! scope="col" | Structures Destroyed
|-
! scope="row" |Alaska Interagency
|||$14,837,241.00||8
|-
! scope="row" |Northwest Area
|||$334,672,820.78||4,473
|-
! scope="row" |Northern California Area
|||$1,369,875,556.25||7,410
|-
! scope="row" |Southern California Area
|||$751,084,644.00||1,824
|-
! scope="row" |Northern Rockies
|||$71,770,047.00||222
|-
! scope="row" |Great Basin
|||$236,649,112.00||172
|-
! scope="row" |Southwest Area
|||$192,069,000.96||63
|-
! scope="row" |Rocky Mountain Area
|||$276,080,314.34||212
|-
! scope="row" |Eastern Area
|||$522,398.58||19
|-
! scope="row" |Southern Area
|||$14,692,891.11||313
|- class="sortbottom"
! scope="row" | Totals
|||$3,262,254,026.02||14,716
|}

South America 
2020 Córdoba wildfires, Argentina
2020 Delta del Paraná wildfires, Argentina
2020 Amazon and Pantanal wildfires, Brazil

Oceania 
2019–20 Australian bushfire season
2020–21 Australian bushfire season

References 

 
2020